The Sky Polarization Observatory (SPOrt) was an Italian instrument planned for launch to the International Space Station in for a planned 2-year mission beginning in 2007. There it would observe 80% of the sky for the Cosmic microwave background radiation in the frequency range from 20 to 100 GHz. Apart from detecting large scale CMB polarization it will also provide maps of Galactic synchrotron emission at lowest frequencies.

The project was headed by Stefano Cortiglioni of the IASF-CNR in Bologna and completely funded by the Italian Space Agency. Due to the project's reliance on the Space Shuttle, and the setback of the Columbia disaster, timely launch was unlikely. Cortiglioni therefore canceled the project in 2005 to allow his team to seek more promising research avenues.

Instrumentation
SPOrt carries four feed horns sensitive at 22, 32 and 90 GHz which feed a bolometer with a pixel sensitivity of 1.7 μK.

See also
Cosmic microwave background experiments
Observational cosmology

References

External links
 SPOrt Homepage
 SPOrt page at the Italian National Institute for Astrophysics

Cosmic microwave background experiments